Leonard James King  (1 May 1925 – 23 June 2011) was an Australian politician, lawyer and judge.

Early life
King matriculated from St Joseph's Memorial School at age 14, then worked at Shell Company as a clerk. He served in the Royal Australian Air Force in Australia and New Guinea during World War II, and used the Commonwealth Reconstruction Training Scheme to commence study for his law degree.

Legal career
King was admitted to practice as a barrister and solicitor in December 1950, and appointed Queen's Counsel in 1967.

Political career
King was a Labor Party member of the South Australian House of Assembly from 1970 to 1975, representing the eastern suburbs electoral district of Coles. He was appointed to various ministerial portfolios during his career, including Aboriginal Affairs, Social Welfare, Community Welfare, and Prices & Consumer Affairs. In late 20th century South Australian history, he is one of the few newly-elected members of Parliament that have been appointed straight to a Cabinet position without any previous parliamentary experience. He was the 40th Attorney-General of South Australia during the reformist Don Dunstan government, from 1970 until 1975.

Judicial career
King was a puisne justice of the Supreme Court of South Australia from 20 June 1975 until his promotion to Chief Justice on 30 October 1978. He retired on 28 April 1995. King worked until his death as a part-time mediator and sometimes as an Acting Justice of the Supreme Court of South Australia.

Recognition
King was appointed a Companion of the Order of Australia (AC) in the 1987 Queen's Birthday Honours "For service to the South Australian Parliament, Government and to the law."

Legacy
The South Australian Electoral district of King was created before the 2018 state election and named after Len King. It covers the northern foothills of the Mount Lofty Ranges including Bibaringa, Yattalunga, Uleybury, One Tree Hill, Gould Creek, Hillbank, Salisbury Park, Salisbury Heights, Greenwith, Golden Grove and part of Salisbury East

See also
 Judiciary of Australia

References

External links
 
 

1925 births
2011 deaths
Australian King's Counsel
Chief Justices of South Australia
Companions of the Order of Australia
Members of the South Australian House of Assembly
Adelaide Law School alumni
Attorneys-General of South Australia
Judges of the Supreme Court of South Australia
20th-century Australian judges
Royal Australian Air Force personnel of World War II
Australian Labor Party members of the Parliament of South Australia